Ortho Mattress is an American mattress and bedding company with retail and manufacturing headquarters in La Mirada, California. It was founded in 1957 in Gardena, California.  In 1996, Ortho merged with W. Simmons Industries and was renamed W.E. Bedding in 1997.  By 1998 High Street Holdings, owned by the Karmin family, acquires Ortho Mattress. In 2002, the mattress company reopened their own factory in Cerritos, California where they began making their own mattress components in-house.  The name WE Bedding was officially named Ortho Mattress by 2004.  In 2007, it moved all manufacturing of its products to Southern California from China and the following year moved its headquarters to La Mirada, California.  In 2007, it moved all manufacturing of its products back to Southern California from China. In 2018, the mattress retailer plans to expand to Arizona to allow the production of more components.  Presently, Ortho Mattress has more than 70 stores throughout the region including Los Angeles, Orange, San Diego, Ventura and Santa Barbara counties. The mattress maker employs approximately 240 people.

Ortho Mattress was named "Best Mattress Store" in the Valley/Ventura area of Los Angeles by Los Angeles Times readers in its inaugural Readers’ Choice 2012.  

Brands like Avant, Cool Quilt, Entice, Doctor Preferred, Doctor Preferred Reserve and The Club Collection are all manufactured under the Ortho Mattress, Inc. brand.  They also carry top name mattress brands like Tempur-Pedic, Stearns and Foster, and Aireloom.

References

External links
Official website

Mattress retailers of the United States

Orthopaedic Memory Foam Mattress

 why an orthopedic mattress is the best choice